Darreh-ye Gayelan (also Romanized as Darreh-ye Gāyelān; also known as Darreh Gavīlūn) is a village in Qilab Rural District, Alvar-e Garmsiri District, Andimeshk County, Khuzestan Province, Iran. At the 2006 census, its population was 63, in 11 families.

References 

Populated places in Andimeshk County